Ludbreg is a town in Croatia, located halfway between Varaždin and Koprivnica near the river Drava. It has 3,603 inhabitants, and a total of 8,478 in the entire municipality (census 2011).

History

For centuries Ludbreg has been a popular place of pilgrimage. In 1320 the city was mentioned for the first time as Castrum Ludbreg, when owned by Hungarian noble Nicholas Ludbregi. The name of the town comes probably from a crusader named Lobring, who founded the settlement. The renovated Castle of Batthyány is home to a well-known restoration workshop. Ludbreg is also a region of vineyard cultivation (especially Riesling and Graševina).

The town became famous after the eucharistic miracle, which happened in the castle chapel in 1411 and was investigated and confirmed by Pope Leo X in 1513.

In the late 19th and early 20th century, Ludbreg was a district capital in Varaždin County of the Kingdom of Croatia-Slavonia.

On 24 April 1932, the town saw a protest that was one of the earliest open acts of resistance against the 6 January Dictatorship

Municipality 
The following settlements comprise the Ludberg municipality:

 Apatija, population 250
 Bolfan, population 413
 Čukovec, population 322
 Globočec Ludbreški, population 491
 Hrastovsko, population 760
 Kućan Ludbreški, population 186
 Ludbreg, population 3,603
 Segovina, population 37
 Selnik, population 844
 Sigetec Ludbreški, population 667
 Slokovec, population 257
 Vinogradi Ludbreški, population 648

Population

Notable people 
 Rudolf Fizir (1891–1960), airplane constructor
 Mladen Kerstner (1928–1991), writer
 Dubravka Krušelj Jurković (born 1972), opera singer
 Tomislav Mužek (born 1976), opera singer
 Vladimir Filipović (1906–1984), philosopher
 Sara Kolak (born 1995), javelin thrower
  (born 1951)

References

External links

 Ludbreg official site 

Cities and towns in Croatia
Populated places in Varaždin County
Varaždin County (former)
Pannonia Superior